Psilogramma choui is a moth of the family Sphingidae. It is known from Zhejiang in China.

References

Psilogramma
Moths described in 2001
Endemic fauna of Zhejiang